A game piece (or gamepiece) may refer to:

 Game piece (board game)
 Game piece (hieroglyph), in Ancient Egypt games
 Game piece (music)
 Lottery ticket

See also
 Player character